Ganjereh may refer to:

Ganjereh-ye Olya
Ganjereh-ye Vosta